The 1993 Kazakhstan Cup is the second season of the Kazakhstan Cup, the annual nationwide football cup competition of Kazakhstan since the independence of the country. The contest kicks off on March 24 and concludes with the final in November 1993. Kairat are the defending champions, having won their first cup in the 1992 competition.

First round

Second round

Quarter-finals

Semi-finals

Final

References

Kazakhstan Cup seasons
1993 domestic association football cups
Cup